Piers FitzThomas Butler of Duiske (died 1601), was the illegitimate son of Thomas Butler, 10th Earl of Ormond. The lands of Duiske Abbey had reverted to his father. In 1597, the earl executed a deed of conveyance in his favour for the lands (when Piers had reached maturity).

Marriage and issue
He married Katherine Fleming, the eldest daughter and co-heiress of Thomas Fleming, 10th Baron Slane and Catherine Preston. They had two sons. Piers was succeeded by his eldest son Sir Edward Butler of Duiske, knt. On 16 May 1646, Edward was created Viscount Galmoye.

See also
 Butler dynasty

References

1601 deaths
Year of birth unknown
Piers FitzThomas
People from County Kilkenny
16th-century Irish people
17th-century Irish people